Tiquipaya is a town in the Cochabamba Department in central Bolivia. It is the seat of the Tiquipaya Municipality, the third municipal section of the Quillacollo Province. It is known as the "city of flowers". The town hosts many dairy farmers and is known as a well visited and productive zone with surprising climatic diversity due to valleys, high plains, and sub-tropical regions. The town homes the Universidad del Valle (UNIVALLE) that helps in the economy of the region as a result of the services required. Around 2% of the population of Tiquipaya was born in a foreign country. Most of them are students from Brasil.

References 

  Instituto Nacional de Estadistica de Bolivia  (INE)

Populated places in Cochabamba Department